Stonebridge Estate may refer to:
Stonebridge, London, England
Stonebridge, New Zealand, in the city of Hamilton